Raúl Marcelo Santos Colindres (born 3 August 1992) is a Honduran footballer who plays as a defender for Motagua.

Club career

Motagua
In July 2017, Santos moved to Motagua. He made his league debut for the club on 27 August 2017, coming on as a 76th-minute substitute for Erick Andino in a 3–2 away victory over Honduras Progreso. In June 2019, Santos signed a contract extension with the club.

International career
He made his national team debut on 10 October 2020 in a friendly against Nicaragua.

Personal life
In November 2016, Santos was falsely arrested on drug trafficking charges while visiting his mother. He was released shortly after being arrested, as he wasn't involved in the operation.

References

External links

1992 births
Living people
C.D.S. Vida players
F.C. Motagua players
Liga Nacional de Fútbol Profesional de Honduras players
Honduran footballers
Honduras international footballers
Association football defenders
People from La Ceiba